Dante Rezze (born 27 April 1963) is a French former professional racing cyclist. He rode in three editions of the Tour de France and two editions of the Giro d'Italia.

References

External links
 

1963 births
Living people
French male cyclists
Cyclists from Lyon